Graeme O'Donnell (born 19 July 1938) is a former Australian rules footballer who played with Geelong and North Melbourne in the Victorian Football League (VFL).	His son, Gary, was a premiership player and captain with Essendon in the 1980s and 1990s.

Family
O'Donnell is the son of Leo O'Donnell and Eileen O'Donnell (née Rankin). His mother was the daughter of Teddy Rankin and the sister of Bert, Cliff and Doug Rankin. Graeme is the father of both Gary O'Donnell and Shelley O'Donnell. Gary played for Essendon between 1987 and 1998 and Shelley is a former Australia netball international.

References

External links 

Living people
1938 births
Australian rules footballers from Victoria (Australia)
Geelong Football Club players
North Melbourne Football Club players
Geelong West Football Club players
Rankin family of Geelong